Mark Gamba is an American politician in the U.S. state of Oregon who currently serves in the Oregon House of Representatives representing the 41st district in Milwaukie. Previously, Gamba served as mayor of Milwaukie.

Early life
Gamba was born and raised in Colorado.

Career
Although he has lived in Oregon for over two decades, Gamba has worked all over the world as a photographer with many assignments from National Geographic.  He served on the Milwaukie City Council prior to his election as Mayor and also worked on the Planning Commission.

In 2022, Gamba was elected to an open seat in the Oregon House of Representatives.

External links
 Legislative website

References

Mayors of places in Oregon
Democratic Party members of the Oregon House of Representatives
Living people